The Pence Springs Hotel Historic District is a national historic district located at  Pence Springs, Summers County, West Virginia. It encompasses seven contributing buildings and two contributing structures.  They are the Pence Springs Hotel Building (1916-1918), Pavilion / Casino (1919), Hotel Manager's Residence / Warden's Residence (c. 1919), Hotel Garage (1925), Golf Caddy House (1919), Pence Springs Bottling Works (c. 1915), and Pence Springhouse (c. 1901).

It was listed on the National Register of Historic Places in 1985.

References

American Craftsman architecture in West Virginia
Bungalow architecture in West Virginia
Colonial Revival architecture in West Virginia
Geography of Summers County, West Virginia
Georgian Revival architecture in West Virginia
Golf clubs and courses in West Virginia
Historic districts in Summers County, West Virginia
Hotel buildings on the National Register of Historic Places in West Virginia
Resorts in West Virginia
National Register of Historic Places in Summers County, West Virginia
Historic districts on the National Register of Historic Places in West Virginia